Silmiougou may refer to:

Silmiougou, Boudry, Burkina Faso
Silmiougou, Boulgou, Burkina Faso
Silmiougou, Zoungou, Burkina Faso